Annie Boclé (married name is Clidière) (born 6 July 1957 at Paimpol) is a former French athlete, who specialised in the Javelin.

Biography  
She won three French national titles in the Javelin, in 1974, 1976 and 1980.

Her personal best in the javelin is 54.58 m (1981).

prize list  
 French Championships in Athletics   :  
 winner in the javelin 1974,  1976 and 1980

Records

External links  
  Docathlé2003, French Athletics Federation, 2003 p. 391

1957 births
Living people
French female javelin throwers
21st-century French women